Timber Top Mountain is an  mountain summit located in the Kolob Canyons section of Zion National Park, in Washington County, Utah, United States. Timber Top Mountain is the second-highest peak in Zion Park, following only Horse Ranch Mountain. Walls of Navajo sandstone encircle this mesa-like feature, ranging from 400-ft high on along the south side, up to 2,000 feet on the north aspect. Kolob Arch is set on the lower southeast cliff of the mountain, and Shuntavi Butte forms the west tip of the mountain. Precipitation runoff from the mountain drains into Timber Creek, which is within the Virgin River drainage basin.

See also
 
 Geology of the Zion and Kolob canyons area
 Colorado Plateau

References

Gallery

External links
 Wikimedia Commons: Timber Top Mountain
 Zion National Park National Park Service
 Weather: Timber Top Mountain

Mountains of Utah
Zion National Park
Mountains of Washington County, Utah
Landforms of Washington County, Utah
Colorado Plateau
North American 2000 m summits